The 1959 Army Cadets football team represented the United States Military Academy in the 1959 NCAA University Division football season. In their first year under head coach Dale Hall, the Cadets compiled a 4–4–1 record and outscored all opponents by a combined total of 174 to 141.  In the annual Army–Navy Game, the Cadets lost 43–12 to the Midshipmen. The Cadets also lost to Illinois, Penn State, and Oklahoma. 
 
Army end Bill Carpenter was a consensus first-team player on the 1959 College Football All-America Team.

Schedule

Personnel

References

Army
Army Black Knights football seasons
Army Cadets football